G. W. Benn was an American football coach.  He served as the head football coach at Cooper Memorial College—now known as Sterling College—in Sterling, Kansas for one season, in 1900, compiling a record of 2–1.

References

Year of birth missing
Year of death missing
Sterling Warriors football coaches